KVCP (88.3 FM) is a non-commercial educational radio station broadcasting a Conservative Christian radio format. Licensed to Phoenix, Arizona, it serves the Phoenix metropolitan area. The station is owned by VCY America, Inc.

KVCP operates as a shared-time station; it broadcasts from 5 a.m. to 7:30 p.m., with the remaining hours used by Family Radio's KPHF for its Christian radio format. The stations' owners began this shared time arrangement in 1990 after both vying for the frequency. Both KVCP and KPHF use the same transmitter off Shaw Butte Trail in Phoenix.

History
The station went on the air in 1992 as KNAI, a non-commercial educational radio station broadcasting a radio format of Regional Mexican music and information for farm workers and other immigrants from Mexico. The station was owned by the National Farm Workers Service Center, Inc., and carried the Radio Campesina Network, with stations in California, Nevada and Arizona. The word "campesina" translates to "peasant" or "farm worker."

On September 2, 2011, lawyers representing radio stations KNAI and KUFW (Woodlake, California) notified the FCC that license holder National Farm Workers Service Center, Inc., had legally changed its name to the "César Chávez Foundation" on June 30, 2010.  Chávez was a noted leader of the Farm Workers movement.

In March 2017, it was announced that the César Chávez Foundation was planning to buy AM 860 KMVP, also in Phoenix, which would allow programming to be heard around the clock in the Phoenix media market, while KNAI was off the air. On May 15, 2017, KNAI added the "-FM" suffix; the same day, KMVP changed its call letters to KNAI. CCF paired 860 AM with an FM translator, and in October, La Campesina moved exclusively to 860 AM and 101.9 FM; the station then began airing a loop directing listeners to the new frequencies. KNAI-FM changed its call letters to KCCF-FM on February 8, 2018. The move of the "La Campesina" programming from a non-commercial educational station to a commercial radio station coincided with a $115,000 fine for violations of the FCC's underwriting regulations at KNAI-FM and KUFW; the network's other stations operate on a commercial basis.

On September 24, 2018, the Cesar Chavez Foundation announced that they had sold KCCF-FM to Wisconsin-based evangelical Christian broadcaster VCY America for $4.9 million, who was to maintain the shared-time arrangement with Family Radio and KPHF, making 88.3 a full-time Christian station, albeit with two different operators and licenses. The sale was consummated on December 31, 2018, at which point VCY America changed the station's call sign to KVCP.

Previous logo

References

External links

Hispanic and Latino American culture in Phoenix, Arizona
Mexican-American culture in Arizona
VCP
Radio stations established in 1992
1992 establishments in Arizona
VCY America stations